Belarusian State Medical University (educational establishment “Belarusian State Medical University” – BSMU ( — БДМУ)( — БГМУ) is a university in Minsk, Belarus. It specialises in medicine and dentistry.

History
The beginning of the university's history dates back to 1921, when it was announced the opening of the Belarusian State University, which at that time included the medical faculty, which was separated in 1930 as an independent educational institution.

In 1930, the Belarusian medical Institute was founded on the basis of the faculty. During the Second World War, from June 1941 to October 1943, the Institute did not function, and then its work resumed in the city of Yaroslavl (Russian Federation). In 1944, the Belarusian medical Institute returned to its former location in the city of Minsk. In 1960, the faculty of dentistry was established. 

In 1995, the military medical faculty was established as part of the institute.
In September 2011, the faculty of pharmacy was opened.

Political repressions, sanctions
On 21 June 2021, Siarhei Rubnikovich, Rector of the Belarusian State Medical University, was added to the EU-led list of people and organizations sanctioned in relation to human rights violations in Belarus. According to the official decision of the EU, "In his position as the Rector of the Belarusian State Medical University, whose appointment was approved by Alexander Lukashenka, Siarhei Rubnikovich is responsible for the decision of University administration to expel students for taking part in peaceful protests. The expulsion orders were taken following Lukashenka's call on 27 October 2020 for expelling from universities students taking part in protests and strikes."

Campus

Faculties
 Faculty of Pediatrics
 Faculty of General medicine
 Faculty of Military Medicine
 Faculty of Preventive Medicine
 Faculty for International Students
 Faculty of dentistry
 Pharmaceutical faculty
 Faculty of Career Guidance and pre-University Training

Transport connections
 Metro:Pyatrowshchyna (Minsk Metro)0,4 km
 Metro:Malinawka (Minsk Metro) 1,4 km
 Metro:Mikhalova (Minsk Metro) 2.0 km
 Bus: 84, 74c
 Trolleybus: 10, 25

References

External links
 Belarusian State Medical University website
 БГМУ на on YouTube
 tools.wmflabs.org information
 www.webometrics.info information
 academic.microsoft.com information

1921 establishments in Belarus
Educational institutions established in 1921
Universities in Minsk
Medical schools in Belarus